Twin Houses is a historic home located at Shawboro, Currituck County, North Carolina. It was built about 1797, and consists of two separate two-story, five bay by two bay, identical Federal style structures, joined by a transverse hall. Each house has a hall-and-parlor plan, exterior end chimneys, and they are connected by a one-story, gable roofed, connecting hall.

It was listed on the National Register of Historic Places in 1972.

Col. Henry Shaw and his wife are buried at the property, which is currently owned by local historian E. Ray Ethrridge.

References

Houses on the National Register of Historic Places in North Carolina
Federal architecture in North Carolina
Houses completed in 1797
Houses in Currituck County, North Carolina
National Register of Historic Places in Currituck County, North Carolina